The 74th Massachusetts General Court, consisting of the Massachusetts Senate and the Massachusetts House of Representatives, met in 1853 during the governorship of John H. Clifford. Charles Henry Warren served as president of the Senate and George Bliss served as speaker of the House.

Senators

Representatives

See also
 Massachusetts Constitutional Convention of 1853
 33rd United States Congress
 List of Massachusetts General Courts

References

Further reading

External links
 
 

Political history of Massachusetts
Massachusetts legislative sessions
massachusetts
1853 in Massachusetts